It Still Ain't Easy is a studio album by blues singer Long John Baldry. It marks the 20th anniversary of his US breakthrough album It Ain't Easy in 1971. Much of the material from It Still Ain't Easy was regularly performed in concert.

Track listing 

 "It Still Ain't Easy" (Tom Lavin, David Raven) - 4:04
 "Midnight In New Orleans" (Len O'Connor, Matthew Horner) - 3:23
 "One Step Ahead" (Al Walker) - 4:12
 "I Never Loved Nobody" (Len O'Connor, Matthew Horner, Michael Timothy Jackson) - 4:24
 "Get It While The Gettin's Good" (Daryl Burgess) - 4:08
 "What've I Been Drinking" (Jack Lavin) - 2:54
 "Insane Asylum" (Willie Dixon) - 5:18
 "You Wanna Dance" (David Brewer) - 4:00
 "Shake That Thang" (Al Walker) - 3:44
 "Like You Promised" (Laurie Coyle, Sue Elton, Neil Shilkin, Charles Bell, Corrine Hawkes) - 4:29
 "Busker" (Tom Lavin, David Raven) - 3:13
 "Can't Keep From Crying" (Traditional) - 2:07
 "No More" (Traditional) - 3:16
 "Soft and Furry" (Eddie Jefferson, Johnny Griffin) - 2:59

Personnel 
 Long John Baldry - Vocals and 12 string guitar
 Darryl Bennett - Drums
 Bill Runge - Bass, soprano saxophone
 Teddy Borowiecki - Piano, Keyboards
 Mike Kalanj - Hammond B3
 David Raven - Slide guitar
 Tom Lavin - Lead & rhythm guitar, tambourine, background vocals
 Butch Coulter - Harmonica
 Kathi McDonald - Vocals
 Papa John King - Acoustic guitar
 Amos Garrett - Guitar
 Gaye Delorme - Slide guitar
 Tony Coleman - Drums
 Russell Jackson - Bass
 Willie MacCalder - Piano
 Lucky Peterson - Lead guitar
 Bobby King - Background vocals
 Terry Evans - Background vocals
 Colin James - Lead guitar
 Al Walker - Rhythm guitar
 Laurie Coyle - Guitars
 Corrine Hawkes - Backup vocals
 Kevin O'Brien - Backup vocals
 Neil Shilkin - Bass and drum programming
 Charles Bell  Bass and drum programming
 Rene Worst - Bass
 Pat Coleman - Guitar
 Pat Caird - Saxophone
 Recorded and mixed at Blue Wave Studios, 34 West 8th Ave., Vancouver, B.C. Canada V5Y 1M7 (604) 873-3388
 Chief engineer: Perry Barrett
 Second engineer: Marcel Duperreault
 Assistant engineer: Guy Winger
 Arrangements by Tom Lavin, except 'Like You Promised, arr. by Neil Shilkin and Laurie Coyle
 Colin James appears courtesy of Virgin Records
 Bobby King & Terry Evans appear courtesy of Rounder Records
 Lucky Peterson appears courtesy of Alligator Records
 Tony Coleman & Russell Jackson appear courtesy of Antone's Records
 Gaye Delorme appears courtesy of Sony Music
 Design & artwork: Clive Blewchamp
 Typesetting: Cam Westren
 Photography: D. Lippingwell
 Long John Baldry says: "thanks to everyone who helped me pull this one off; they all know who they are! The generous assistance of FACTOR and VideoFACT is also acknowledged."
 Produced by Tom Lavin for Stony Plain Records

References

1991 albums
Long John Baldry albums
Stony Plain Records albums